Jean-Jacques Eydelie (born 3 February 1966) is a French former professional footballer most noted for his role in the Marseille UEFA Champions league 1993 win.

Career
Eydelie was born in Angoulême, Charente. A midfielder, he began his career with Nantes, before joining Marseille in 1992. His first season at Marseille was a success, with the club finishing top of the league, and winning the Champions League, but shortly after the Champions League final, it was revealed that he had contacted three players at Ligue 1 club Valenciennes (Jorge Burruchaga, Christophe Robert and Jacques Glassman) on behalf of the Marseille board, in order to offer bribes. Marseille needed to beat Valenciennes to secure the championship, and had induced the Valenciennes players to "go easy" in order that the Marseille players would not be overly exerted before the Champions League final. It was Glassman who reported the bribe, which resulted in Marseille being stripped of the 1993 French title, banned from defending the Champions League (although the win still stood), and relegated to Ligue 2. Eydelie was banned for a year by FIFA, given a one-year suspended sentence, and served 17 days in prison. Members of the Marseille board were given longer prison sentences, and Valenciennes players Burruchaga and Robert received FIFA bans for their involvement.

Upon his return to football, Eydelie had a nomadic career. He trained for a few months at Benfica, played in England, Switzerland and back in France before retiring in 2003.

From 2006 to 2007 he was the manager of amateur club Limoges Foot 87.

In 2006, Eydelie released his autobiography, telling of corruption and doping during his time at Marseille. Former OM chairman Bernard Tapie sued unsuccessfully for libel (which he is planning to appeal), and former teammate Didier Deschamps has also threatened legal action.

Honours
 UEFA Champions League: 1993

References

External links
 
 
 

1966 births
Living people
People from Angoulême
Sportspeople from Charente
French footballers
Association football midfielders
FC Nantes players
Stade Lavallois players
Tours FC players
Olympique de Marseille players
S.L. Benfica footballers
SC Bastia players
FC Sion players
Walsall F.C. players
FC Zürich players
US Avranches players
Stade Beaucairois players
Association football controversies
20th-century French criminals
French expatriate footballers
Expatriate footballers in Portugal
Expatriate footballers in Switzerland
Expatriate footballers in England
French football managers
Limoges FC managers
UEFA Champions League winning players
Footballers from Nouvelle-Aquitaine